ʿAffān ibn Abī al-ʿĀṣ was a famous 6th-century Arab merchant, a contemporary of the young Muhammad (–632) and the father of Uthman ibn Affan, the third Rashidun caliph.

His father was Abu al-As ibn Umayya. His nephew was Marwan ibn al-Hakam. His sister was Safiyya bint Abi al-As, who was the mother of Ramla bint Abi Sufyan (a wife of the prophet Muhammad).

Affan married Arwa bint Kurayz, she was the daughter of Kurayz ibn Rabi'ah and Umm Hakim bint Shayba ibn Hashim. She was also a cousin of Muhammad.

His son Uthman was born in Ta'if. The exact date is disputed: both 576 and 583 are indicated. He is listed as one of the 22 Meccans "at the dawn of Islam" who knew how to write.

Affan died at a young age while travelling abroad, leaving Uthman with a large inheritance. He became a merchant like his father, and his business flourished, making him one of the richest men among the Quraysh.

Some of his important relatives and the family tree 

 Uthman (aka Uthman ibn Affan) is known as the Possessor of Two Lights. This is because he was greatly loved by Muhammad and married to two of his daughters. He was first married to Ruqayyah (Ruqayyah bint Muhammad), and when she died, there is the Hadith which talks of how Hafsa (Hafsa bint Umar) came to be the wife of Muhammad and Umm e Kulthum came to be the wife of Uthman. 
Umm e Kulthum, the third daughter of Muhammad was married to Uthman after the death of her older sister Ruqayyah. (Ruqayyah was the second daughter of Muhammad.) 
Muhammad had four daughters.
Zainab (Zainab bint Muhammad) m. Abu al-As ibn al-Rabi'.
Ruqqayah (Ruqqayah bint Muhammad) m. Uthman (Uthman ibn Affan).
Umm e Kulthum (Umm e Kulthum) m Uthman (Uthman ibn Affan).(She married Uthman after Ruqqayah's death.)
Fatima Zahra (Fatima bint Muhammad) m. Ali (Ali ibn Abu Talib).

See also
Sahaba

Sources

External links
http://www.witness-pioneer.org/vil/Articles/companion/01_uthman_bin_ghani.htm

Banu Umayya
Sahabah ancestors
People from Mecca
6th-century Arabs
Place of birth unknown
Year of birth unknown
Year of death unknown